Arthur Willink (1850-1913) was a nineteenth-century British theologian and clergyman.

Biography

His most notable work is The World of the Unseen, a piece in which he argues that the universe consists of three parallel planes: the earth, heaven, and hell. God, Willink argues, exists on a complete separate, infinite-dimensional space completely removed from these three planes.

In The World of the Unseen, he wrote:

 
Willink was one of the earliest philosophers to postulate that the world exists in more than the three dimensions we are used to, thus setting the stage for the development of hyperspace theories.

He was curate in charge at Wye Church from 1895 to 1896.

Works
Not Death's Dark Night: An Hour's Communion With The Dead (1892) 
The World of the Unseen: An Essay on the Relation of Higher Space to Things Eternal (1893)

References

External links
 

British theologians
1850 births
1913 deaths